is an arcade video game developed by Coreland and published by Sega in Japan on September 26, 1982, then to North America the following month. Following Europe that December. The player controls Pengo, a red penguin that resides in the Antarctic. The game takes place in an overhead maze made of ice blocks, where Pengo crushes blob-like Sno-Bees by sliding blocks into them. The objective is to survive each round by eliminating all Sno-Bees and Sno-Bee eggs, while optionally lining up the three diamond blocks for a large bonus.

There are two versions of the arcade game: the first uses "Popcorn" as the theme, and the second has original music. There are other small differences as well. Pengo was ported to the Atari 2600, Atari 5200, Atari 8-bit family, and Game Gear.

Gameplay

The player uses a four-position joystick and a single button to control Pengo, a penguin character. Pressing the button while pushing the joystick against an ice block will cause it to slide in that direction until it hits another block or a wall if space directly ahead of it is unoccupied by a block or wall. If that space is occupied, pressing the button will crush the block instead.

The goal is to destroy every Sno-Bee on the board by sliding ice blocks to crush them, crushing blocks that contain unhatched Sno-Bee eggs, or running over them after stunning them at a wall.

At the start of each round, a certain number of eggs hatch into Sno-Bees, while other blocks flash to indicate that they contain eggs. As the player destroys active Sno-Bees, new ones hatch from the eggs to replace them. Crushing multiple Sno-Bees with one block awards extra points. The Sno-Bees can crush blocks in an attempt to reach Pengo. Pushing against a wall causes it to vibrate and temporarily stuns any Sno-Bees in contact with it; the player may then crush them with a block or simply run over them to destroy them. Contact with a Sno-Bee costs the player one life.

Three blocks in each round are marked with diamonds and cannot be crushed. Arranging these blocks in a continuous horizontal or vertical line awards bonus points (more if not against a wall) and temporarily stuns every active Sno-Bee. If the player eliminates every Sno-Bee in less than 60 seconds, bonus points are awarded based on the time taken.

If the player survives for two minutes without either losing a life or completing the round, all active Sno-Bees become Blobs. Their movement speed increases and they will move directly toward one of the walls, crushing all ice blocks in their path. Once a Blob reaches a wall, it will move toward a corner of the screen and disappear upon reaching it. Once all Blobs have either disappeared or been destroyed, the round ends. If the player destroys one of the last two Sno-Bees, the survivor will become a Blob after a 12-second delay. However, if the player destroys multiple Sno-Bees and leaves only one alive, it will become a Blob immediately.

The game includes a total of 16 rounds. After every second round, one of six intermission animations is displayed.

Reception 
In Japan, the annual Game Machine chart listed Pengo as the fourth highest-grossing arcade game of 1982. Game Machine later listed Pengo in their June 1, 1983 issue as the fifteenth top-grossing table arcade cabinet of the month. In North America, the game was a commercial arcade success for Sega in 1982, and it sold an estimated 2,000 arcade cabinets in the United States.

Computer and Video Games (C&VG) magazine gave it a highly positive review upon release, calling it "the cutest of coin-operated video games" and praising the "wonderful graphics, delightful characterisation, plenty of scope to work out your own" tactics, "catchy melody" and "that feeling of satisfaction you get when an ice-block picks up speed and knocks all the wind out of a surprised sno-bee!" Four members of the C&VG team gave a verdict that "is unanimous... Pengo is the C&VG tip for 1983."

Legacy
In 1982 and 1983 Bandai Electronics created two official Sega licensed handheld games featuring Pengo. The first was an LCD pocket game, the second a VFD tabletop version. In 1995 a brand new game called Pepenga Pengo was released for the Sega Mega Drive only in Japan.

According to Zero magazine, Hudson Soft's Bomberman series adopted gameplay elements from Pengo.

In 2010 a location test for the wide screen remake was announced in arcades, which features eight player multiplay. A second location test took place at Sega Shinjuku Nishiguchi in May 2012. During the 3rd location test at Club Sega Akihabara Shinkan between 2012-07-14 and 2012-07-16 as part of the 4-game compilation title named 'Ge-sen Love ~Plus Pengo!~' (ゲーセンラブ。～プラス ペンゴ！～), the game was made available as a download by RINGEDGE2 machines through Sega's new ALL.NET P-ras Multi game network, and was later released on 2012-09-20. The compilation title is included with the Xbox 360 game Ge-sen Love Plus Pengo!.

Clones
Contemporaraneous Pengo clones include Orca's Penga, Pengi for the BBC Micro and Acorn Electron, Percy Penguin for the Commodore 64, Block Buster for the VIC-20, Chilly Willy for the Microbee, Pengon for the TRS-80 Color Computer, the unrelated Pengon for the Atari 8-bit family, Pengy for the Atari ST, Freez'Bees and Do-Do for the ZX Spectrum, Stone Age for the VTech CreatiVision, and Pango for MS-DOS. Hopper is a clone for the TI-99/4A with a kangaroo instead of a penguin.

References

External links

Pengo for the Atari 8-bit family at Atari Mania

1982 video games
Arcade video games
Atari 2600 games
Atari 5200 games
Atari 8-bit family games
Commodore 64 games
Fictional penguins
Game Gear games
Maze games
Multiplayer and single-player video games
Multiplayer hotseat games
Sega arcade games
Sega Games franchises
Sega video games
Banpresto games
Vertically-oriented video games
Video games about birds
Video games developed in Japan
Video games set in Antarctica
Virtual Console games